Mary O'Shiell (1715d. after 1745), was a French-Irish privateer shipowner and slave trader. She is a known figure in the history of Nantes, alongside her sisters Agnés O'Shiell and Anne O'Shiell.

Life

She was the daughter of the Irish Jacobite Luke O'Shiell (1677-1745), who was born in Dublin but emigrated to Nantes after the Irish defeat, and Agnès Vanasse (1690-1724). The family manor of the O'Shiell, Manoir de la Placelière, became the gathering place of the large Irish colony in Nantes. She married Antoine Walsh, a leading slave trader in the slave trade of Nantes. In 1755, the O'Shiell family became ennobled.

References

  [archive]
  [archive]
  [archive]
 a et b  [archive]
  [archive]

18th-century French businesswomen
18th-century French businesspeople
French people of Irish descent
Businesspeople from Nantes
1715 births
Year of death unknown
French slave traders
Women slave owners